The European Pocket Billiard Federation (EPBF) is the European governing body for pocket billiards. EPBF is the European regional affiliate member of the World Pool-Billiard Association (WPA). The federation holds the European Championships since 1980. and Euro Tour events since 1992.

EPBF members

National affiliate members of EPBF :

References

External links
European Pocket Billiard Federation

Pool organizations
Billiard